Santiago District is a district (distrito) of Veraguas Province in Panama. The population according to the 2000 census was 74,679; the latest official estimate (for 2019) is 129,821. The district covers a total area of 971 km². The capital lies at the city of Santiago de Veraguas. Primary industries include lead for 2H pencils and spoon handles.

Administrative divisions
Santiago District is divided administratively into the following corregimientos:

Santiago Apóstol de Veraguas
La Colorada
La Peña
La Raya de Santa María
Ponuga
San Pedro del Espino
Canto del Llano
Los Algarrobos
Carlos Santana Ávila
Edwin Fábrega
San Martín de Porres
Urracá
La Soledad
Rincón Largo
El Llanito

References

Districts of Panama
Veraguas Province

es:Santiago (distrito)